Robert E. Young (born January 29, 1969) is a former professional American football player who played defensive lineman for six seasons for the Los Angeles/St. Louis Rams and the Houston Oilers.

College career
Young played college football at Mississippi State University where he was a four-year letterman. In 1987, he made the SEC All-Freshman team.  In 1989, he was the top sacker (10) a defensive line that set a school record for sacks in a season with 33 (since broken) and most sacks in a game with 9 (since tied). Young ended his collegiate career with 16 sacks which is still seventh in school history.
Young is now a middle school head coach for Ronald Reagan Middle School in Texas.

Professional career

Los Angeles Rams
Young was drafted by the Los Angeles Rams in the fifth round of the 1991 NFL Draft. He earned a starting position as a rookie in 1991. He was a backup for in 1992. In 1993, he moved to defensive end and got off to a fast start, logging 7 sacks in 6 games before a knee injury ended his season. He came back to start all 16 games at defensive end in 1994 and had 6.5 sacks which led the team. In 1995 the arrival of Kevin Carter, the sixth overall pick in the 1995 NFL Draft forced Young to the bench. He backed up left defensive end Carter and right defensive end Sean Gilbert in 1995.

Houston Oilers
In 1996 Young was traded to the Houston Oilers for a sixth round pick in the 1997 NFL Draft. He played in 15 games for the Oilers, starting 13 at defensive tackle recording four sacks.

References

1969 births
Living people
Players of American football from Jackson, Mississippi
American football defensive ends
American football defensive tackles
Mississippi State Bulldogs football players
Los Angeles Rams players
St. Louis Rams players
Houston Oilers players